Mueller calculus is a matrix method for manipulating Stokes vectors, which represent the polarization of light. It was developed in 1943 by Hans Mueller. In this technique, the effect of a particular optical element is represented by a Mueller matrix—a 4×4 matrix that is an overlapping generalization of the Jones matrix.

Introduction
Disregarding coherent wave superposition, any fully polarized, partially polarized, or unpolarized state of light can be represented by a Stokes vector ; and any optical element can be represented by a Mueller matrix (M).

If a beam of light is initially in the state  and then passes through an optical element M and comes out in a state , then it is written

If a beam of light passes through optical element M1 followed by M2 then M3 it is written

given that matrix multiplication is associative it can be written

Matrix multiplication is not commutative, so in general

Mueller vs. Jones calculi
With disregard for coherence, light which is unpolarized or partially polarized must be treated using the Mueller calculus, while fully polarized light can be treated with either the Mueller calculus or the simpler Jones calculus. Many problems involving coherent light (such as from a laser) must be treated with Jones calculus, however, because it works directly with the electric field of the light rather than with its intensity or power, and thereby retains information about the phase of the waves.
More specifically, the following can be said about Mueller matrices and Jones matrices:
Stokes vectors and Mueller matrices operate on intensities and their differences, i.e. incoherent superpositions of light; they are not adequate to describe either interference or diffraction effects.

(...)

Any Jones matrix [J] can be transformed into the corresponding Mueller–Jones matrix, M, using the following relation:
,
where * indicates the complex conjugate [sic], [A is:]

and ⊗ is the tensor (Kronecker) product.

(...)

While the Jones matrix has eight independent parameters [two Cartesian or polar components for each of the four complex values in the 2-by-2 matrix], the absolute phase information is lost in the [equation above], leading to only seven independent matrix elements for a Mueller matrix derived from a Jones matrix.

Mueller matrices
Below are listed the Mueller matrices for some ideal common optical elements:

General expression for reference frame rotation from the local frame to the laboratory frame:

where  is the angle of rotation. For rotation from the laboratory frame to the local frame, the sign of the sine terms inverts.

 Linear polarizer (horizontal transmission) 

The Mueller matrices for other polarizer rotation angles can be generated by reference frame rotation.
 Linear polarizer (vertical transmission) 

 Linear polarizer (+45° transmission) 

Linear polarizer (−45° transmission)  

 General linear polarizer matrix 
where  is the angle of rotation of the polarizer.

 General linear retarder (wave plate calculations are made from this) 
 Quarter-wave plate (fast-axis vertical) 
 Quarter-wave plate (fast-axis horizontal) 
 Half-wave plate (fast-axis horizontal and vertical; also, ideal mirror) 
 Attenuating filter (25% transmission)

Mueller tensors
The Mueller/Stokes architecture can also be used to describe non-linear optical processes, such as multi-photon excited fluorescence and second harmonic generation. The Mueller tensor can be connected back to the laboratory-frame Jones tensor by direct analogy with Mueller and Jones matrices.
,

See also 
 Stokes parameters
 Jones calculus
 Polarization (waves)

References

Other sources
E. Collett (2005) Field Guide to Polarization, SPIE Field Guides vol. FG05, SPIE .
 Eugene Hecht (1987) Optics, 2nd ed., Addison-Wesley .

 N. Mukunda and others (2010) "A complete characterization pre-Mueller and Mueller matrices in polarization optics", Journal of the Optical Society of America A 27(2): 188 to 99  
 William Shurcliff (1966) Polarized Light: Production and Use, chapter 8 Mueller Calculus and Jones Calculus, page 109, Harvard University Press.
 

Polarization (waves)
Matrices